Chico Creek is a  tributary of the Arkansas River that flows from a source in El Paso County, Colorado.  It joins the Arkansas in Pueblo County just west of the town of Avondale.

See also
List of rivers of Colorado

References

Rivers of Colorado
Tributaries of the Arkansas River
Rivers of El Paso County, Colorado
Rivers of Pueblo County, Colorado